"Line-Up for Yesterday: An ABC of Baseball Immortals" is a poem written by Ogden Nash for the January 1949 issue of SPORT Magazine. In the poem, Nash dedicates each letter of the alphabet to a legendary Major League Baseball player. The poem pays tribute to 24 players altogether, plus one winking reference to himself (under "I") as a fan of the game, and concludes with a final stanza in homage to the players collectively.

Baseball players referred to in the poem

Statistics

18 of the players were also in the Hall of Fame at the time, and all but one (Bobo Newsom) would eventually be inducted.
8 players—Cobb, Gehrig, Hornsby, Johnson, Mathewson, Ruth, Wagner, and Young—would be elected to the All Century Team in 1999.

External links

Full text of the poem

American poems
Baseball poems
1949 poems
Works originally published in American magazines
Works originally published in sports magazines
Cultural depictions of Babe Ruth
Cultural depictions of baseball players
Cultural depictions of American men
Ty Cobb